At 10 cm in length, Macromantis ovalifolia, in the subfamily Macromantinae, is one of the largest species of praying mantis.

References

Mantidae
Insects described in 1813